Slieve Meelbeg is a mountain located in the Mourne Mountains.

References

Mountains and hills of County Down